Riverlea is a suburb in south-eastern Hamilton in New Zealand. It is located south of Hillcrest. The suburb is primarily residential, with a small section of light industrial land along Riverlea Road.

History
It is named after Riverlea House, the homestead on the property of James McPherson which covered most of modern-day Riverlea and Hillcrest. Many of the street names were chosen by landowner Don McKenzie, which he named after aeroplanes he flew in the Second World War (Hudson Street, Lysander Place), his horses (McCracken Avenue, Silva Crescent, Sheriff Place) and his family (Norma Place, Malcolm Street, Louise Place). Johnsview Terrace was named in memory of a boy who drowned in a waterhole which the street overlooked.

Features of Riverlea

Hammond Park
Hammond Park is a public park along the riverbank of the Waikato River. A boardwalk connects the different sections of the park. Hammond Bush, part of the Mangaonua Gully, is home to the rare New Zealand long-tailed bat. The beach along the Malcolm Street section of the park is a popular swimming spot during summer.

A local environmental improvement group (Riverlea Environment Society incorporated) has been instrumental in enhancing the Hammond Bush and campaigning against the building of an asphalt plant.

Riverlea Theatre
The Riverlea Theatre and Arts Centre, established in 1984, is home to Hamilton Musical Theatre and the Hamilton Playbox Repertory Society.

Demographics

Riverlea had a population of 2,775 at the 2018 New Zealand census, an increase of 192 people (7.4%) since the 2013 census, and an increase of 243 people (9.6%) since the 2006 census. There were 957 households, comprising 1,332 males and 1,443 females, giving a sex ratio of 0.92 males per female. The median age was 38.8 years (compared with 37.4 years nationally), with 558 people (20.1%) aged under 15 years, 558 (20.1%) aged 15 to 29, 1,245 (44.9%) aged 30 to 64, and 417 (15.0%) aged 65 or older.

Ethnicities were 73.3% European/Pākehā, 10.5% Māori, 1.8% Pacific peoples, 20.5% Asian, and 3.2% other ethnicities. People may identify with more than one ethnicity.

The percentage of people born overseas was 29.9, compared with 27.1% nationally.

Although some people chose not to answer the census's question about religious affiliation, 51.1% had no religion, 34.6% were Christian, 1.0% had Māori religious beliefs, 1.9% were Hindu, 2.7% were Muslim, 1.7% were Buddhist and 2.3% had other religions.

Of those at least 15 years old, 858 (38.7%) people had a bachelor's or higher degree, and 237 (10.7%) people had no formal qualifications. The median income was $33,000, compared with $31,800 nationally. 480 people (21.7%) earned over $70,000 compared to 17.2% nationally. The employment status of those at least 15 was that 1,053 (47.5%) people were employed full-time, 342 (15.4%) were part-time, and 114 (5.1%) were unemployed.

The 2013 Index of Socioeconomic Deprivation, ranked 1-10 from lowest to most deprived areas, lists Riverlea at 4/10 (low deprivation).

Education

See also
List of streets in Hamilton
Suburbs of Hamilton, New Zealand

References

Suburbs of Hamilton, New Zealand
Populated places on the Waikato River